A penthouse is an apartment or unit on the highest floor of an apartment building, condominium, hotel or tower. Penthouses are typically differentiated from other apartments by luxury features.  The term 'penthouse' originally referred, and sometimes still does refer, to a separate smaller 'house' that was constructed on the roof of an apartment building. Architecturally it refers specifically to a structure on the roof of a building that is set back from its outer walls. These structures do not have to occupy the entire roof deck. Recently, luxury high rise apartment buildings have begun to designate multiple units on the entire top residential floor or multiple higher residential floors including the top floor as penthouse apartments, and outfit them to include ultra-luxury fixtures, finishes, and designs which are different from all other residential floors of the building. These penthouse apartments are not typically set back from the building’s outer walls, but are instead flush with the rest of the building and simply differ in size, luxury, and consequently price. High-rise buildings can also have structures known as mechanical penthouses that enclose machinery or equipment such as the drum mechanisms for an elevator.

Etymology
The modern spelling is influenced by a 16th-century folk etymology that combines the Middle French word for "slope" with the English noun house.

Development

European designers and architects long recognized the potential in creating living spaces that could make use of rooftops and such setbacks. Penthouses first appeared in US cities in the 1920s with the exploitation of roof spaces for upscale property. The first recognized development was atop the Plaza Hotel overlooking Central Park in New York City in 1923.  Its success caused a rapid development of similar luxury penthouse apartments in most major cities in the United States in the following years.

The popularity of penthouses stemmed from the setbacks allowing for significantly larger  private outdoor terrace spaces than traditional cantilevered balconies. Due to the desirability of having outdoor space, buildings began to be designed with setbacks that could accommodate the development of apartments and terraces on their uppermost levels. 

Modern penthouses may or may not have terraces. Upper floor space may be divided among several apartments, or a single apartment may occupy an entire floor. Penthouses often have their own private access where access to any roof, terrace, and any adjacent setback is exclusively controlled.

Design

Penthouses also differentiate themselves by luxurious amenities such as high-end appliances, finest materials fitting, luxurious flooring system, and more.

Features not found in the majority of apartments in the building may include a private entrance or elevator, or higher/vaulted ceilings. In buildings consisting primarily of single level apartments, penthouse apartments may be distinguished by having two or more levels. They may also have such features as a terrace, fireplace, more floor area, oversized windows, multiple master suites, den/office space, hot-tubs, and more. They might be equipped with luxury kitchens featuring stainless steel appliances, granite counter-tops, breakfast bar/island, and more.

Penthouse residents often have fine views of the city skyline. Access to a penthouse apartment is usually provided by a separate elevator. Residents can also access a number of building services, such as pickup and delivery of everything from dry cleaning to dinner; reservations to restaurants and events made by building staffers; and other concierge services.

Cultural references
Penthouse apartments are considered to be at the top of their markets, and are generally the most expensive, with expansive views, large living spaces, and top-of-the-line amenities. Accordingly, they are often associated with a luxury lifestyle.  Publisher Bob Guccione named his magazine Penthouse, with the trademark phrase "Life on top".

See also
 Basement apartment
Luxury apartment
 Roof garden

Notes

References

External links 

 Everything you have to know about Duplex Flats,Apartments & Penthouse In Bangalore By Vanya Homes

Apartment types
Houses